The Wilde Wedding is a 2017 romantic comedy written and directed by Damian Harris, starring Glenn Close, John Malkovich, Patrick Stewart, and Minnie Driver. It received a limited theatrical release and a direct-to-video release, beginning September 15, 2017, by Vertical Entertainment.

Plot
The famous actress Eve Wilde is getting married for the fourth time, this time to the writer Harold. Her first husband, the actor Laurence Darling, and their children and grandchildren attend the wedding. Harold is joined by his two daughters and one of their longtime friends. Sexual tension and romance spread amongst the two families and assembled guests.

Cast
 Glenn Close as Eve Wilde
 John Malkovich as Laurence Darling
 Patrick Stewart as Harold
 Minnie Driver as Priscilla Jones
 Jack Davenport as Rory Darling
 Grace Van Patten as Mackenzie Darling
 Noah Emmerich as Jimmy Darling
 Peter Facinelli as Ethan Darling
 Yael Stone as Clementine
 Lilly Englert as Rose
 Brigette Lundy-Paine as Lara
Jake Katzman as Sam
 Tim Boardman as Dylan
 Kara Jackson as Bee
 Rob Langeder as Al
 Joe Urla as Nelson
 Santiago The Pawstar as YoYo the dog

Reception
On review aggregator website Rotten Tomatoes, the film holds an approval rating of 27% based on 15 reviews, and an average rating of 5.24/10. On Metacritic, the film has a weighted average score of 31 out of 100, based on 6 critics, indicating "generally unfavorable reviews".

References

External links
 
 
 The Wilde Wedding at The Numbers

2017 films
American romantic comedy films
Vertical Entertainment films
2017 romantic comedy films
Films directed by Damian Harris
2010s American films